Kastellaun is a Verbandsgemeinde ("collective municipality") in the Rhein-Hunsrück district, in Rhineland-Palatinate, Germany. Its seat is in Kastellaun. On 1 July 2014 it was expanded with 3 municipalities from the former Verbandsgemeinde Treis-Karden.

The Verbandsgemeinde Kastellaun consists of the following Ortsgemeinden ("local municipalities"):

Verbandsgemeinde in Rhineland-Palatinate